NGC 367 is a spiral galaxy in the constellation of Cetus. It was discovered in 1886 by the astronomer Frank Muller.

References

0367
Cetus (constellation)
Spiral galaxies
Astronomical objects discovered in 1886
003894